Susa Cathedral (or Duomo di Susa) is a Catholic cathedral in Susa, Piedmont, in northern Italy. It is the seat of the Bishop of Susa and is dedicated to Saint Justus of Novalesa.

In origin it was the church of the Benedictine Abbey of St. Justus, established in 1029 by Marchese Olderico Manfredi to house the newly discovered relics of Saint Justus. The church was built around 1100 and has since been refurbished and restored several times. It was not until 1772 that the bishopric of Susa was created from the territory of the abbey, previously a territorial abbacy, and at that point the abbey church was made the cathedral of the new diocese.

The cathedral is a Romanesque style building. The façade has terracotta decorations and is joined to a Roman gate of the 4th century, the Porta Savoia, to the south. Halfway along the south side stands the campanile, with six levels of mullioned windows.

The interior is on the Latin Cross plan, with three aisles. It contains a baptistry which is earlier than the present church, and a statue supposedly of Adelaide, Marchioness of Turin, daughter and heiress of Olderico Manfredi and wife of Otto, Count of Savoy, ancestress of the Royal House of Savoy.

Notes

Sources
 Santi e Beati: Santi Giusto, Flaviano e compagni

External links
Images of the cathedral
Images of the Susa Valley from the top of the campanile

Susa
Susa
Susa
1100 establishments in Europe
11th-century establishments in Italy
12th-century Roman Catholic church buildings in Italy
Romanesque architecture in Piedmont